The British Athletics League is a men-only track and field team competition in the United Kingdom. For women there is the completely separate UK Women's Athletic League.

Launched in 1969, the British Athletics League in 2013 had five different divisions, which gather a total of 38 track and field teams from all over the United Kingdom, although most of them come from England.

Competition
Since 2009, there are five different divisions (Premiership, National 1, National 2, National 3 and National 4). Each of them has eight teams in competition, except the Division 4, with only six teams. Every summer season, two teams are relegated and two teams promoted for every division. The last change in the number of divisions took place in 2009, with the creation of the National 4 division.

In every division there is a total of four matches per season. Teams receive points according to their athletic performances, and those points are transformed in a range of 1 to 8 points for every match, according with the matches' final table. These points are added after the four matches to determine relegations, promotions and champions.

Winning teams
This table lists the top placed clubs from the top division:

Teams in 2016

Premiership

National Division One

National Division Two

National Division Three

National Division Four

References

External links
British Athletic League

Athletics competitions in England
Annual track and field meetings
Track and field in the United Kingdom
Track and field organizations